was a major professional wrestling event produced by New Japan Pro-Wrestling (NJPW). The event took place on April 24, 1989 at the Tokyo Dome in Tokyo, Japan. It was the first major professional wrestling event held in the Tokyo Dome, with wrestlers from the United States, Japan, and the Soviet Union.

The event saw a one night single-elimination tournament for the vacant IWGP Heavyweight Championship, the debut of the Jushin Liger character in NJPW, and Antonio Inoki versus Shota Chochishvili in a no rope martial arts match for the WWF World Martial Arts Heavyweight Championship.

Background 
The Tokyo Dome opened on March 17, 1988. At the time, NJPW looked to use the Dome to hold the first major wrestling event of the Heisei period.

Storylines 
The event featured fourteen professional wrestling matches that involved different wrestlers from pre-existing scripted feuds and storylines. Wrestlers portrayed villains, heroes, or less distinguishable characters in the scripted events that built tension and culminated in a wrestling match or series of matches.

Aftermath 
Battle Satellite in Tokyo Dome was a great success for NJPW, and the Dome would be a home for many years to come for puroresu. Starting in 1992, NJPW returned to the Dome to hold the first of what has become an annual tradition and their biggest show of the year, the January 4 Tokyo Dome Show.

Results

IWGP Heavyweight Championship tournament bracket

References 

New Japan Pro-Wrestling shows
Professional wrestling in Tokyo
1989 in professional wrestling
1989 in Tokyo